William Irvine may refer to:
William Irvine (soldier) (c. 1298–?), Clerk of the Rolls for Scotland
William Irvine (general) (1741–1804), American Revolutionary War general, congressman from Pennsylvania
Col. William Irvine (18th century), American Revolutionary soldier and pioneer, namesake of Irvine, Kentucky
William Irvine (lawyer) (1820–1882), American Civil War soldier, congressman from New York
William Irvine (historian) (1840–1911), British administrator of the Indian Civil Service, known for works on the Moghul Empire
William Irvine (Australian politician) (1858–1943), Premier of Victoria
William Irvine (Scottish evangelist) (1863–1947), evangelist considered the founder of various nameless sects
William Irvine (Canadian politician) (1885–1962), Canadian politician
William Irvine (rugby union) (1898–1952), New Zealand rugby union player
William C. Irvine (missionary) (1871–1946), editor of the Indian Christian and author of Modern Heresies Exposed (1917)
William Irvine (Rhodesian politician) (fl. 1980s)
William D. Irvine (1944-2021), Canadian historian
Willie Irvine (born 1943), footballer from Northern Ireland, played for Burnley, Preston, Brighton & Hove Albion and Northern Ireland
Willie Irvine (footballer, born 1956), Scottish footballer, played for Alloa, Motherwell and Hibernian
Willie Irvine (footballer, born 1963), Scottish footballer, played for Hibernian, Airdrie, Dunfermline, Alloa and Stenhousemuir 
William S. Irvine (1851–1942), member of the Wisconsin Legislature
William Irvine (bishop) (fl. 1718), Scottish bishop
William Irvine (chemist) (1743–1787), British doctor and chemist
William Mann Irvine (1865–1928), American academic
William C. Irvine (politician) (1852–1924), American politician in Wyoming
Bill Irvine (1926–2008), ballroom dancer

See also
William Irvin (disambiguation)
William Irwin (disambiguation)
William Irving (disambiguation)